Carry Nation is an historical play by Frank McGrath about the temperance leader Carrie Nation. It ran on Broadway and starred American film actress Esther Dale in the title role.

Broadway run
Carry Nation premiered in New York on Broadway at the Biltmore Theatre on October 29, 1932 and starred Esther Dale, who had been known principally as a singer up to that time. The show was produced by Dale’s husband, the writer and theater producer Arthur J. Beckhard, and was directed by stage actress Blanche Yurka. The show was playwright McGrath’s only Broadway play and closed after just 30 performances.

Despite its being a flop, the show was notable for having launched the Broadway careers of supporting actress Mildred Natwick and the actors Jimmy Stewart, Myron McCormick and Josh Logan, who had known one another at Princeton University where the three men were members of the University Players theater company. At the time, they were rooming in New York with a fourth University Player alumnus, Henry Fonda. Logan also served as assistant director to Blanche Yurka in the production. The show had originated in summer stock, and some of the young players from the earlier staging were carried over into the New York production in small roles.

Esther Dale received glowing reviews from the New York critics for her portrayal of Carry (sic). In addition to Dale, the featured performers included Leslie Adams, Donald Foster, Daisy Belmore, Byron McGrath, John Parrish, Ernest Pollock and Fannie Bell De Knight.

Principal roles
(in order of speech)
 Aunt Judy - Fannie Belle De Knight
 George Moore - John Parrish
 James Campbell – Myron McCormick
 Mary Campbell Moore - Gertrude Garstin
 Charles Gloyd - Byron McGrath
 Sam - Buddy De Loach
 Mrs. Gloyd - Frieda Altman	
 Dr. Hull - Ernest Pollock
 Miss Sicat - Minna Adams
 David Nation - Leslie Adams
 Carry Nation – Esther Dale
 Mrs. Noble – Mildred Natwick
 Daniel Dent – Donald Foster
 Mrs. Cain – Daisy Belmore
 A Brute - Clarence E. Smith
 Mart Strong – Joshua Logan
 Constable Gano – James Stewart
 Mayor Washbrook - Arthur C. Morris
 O.L. Day – Charles E. Arnt
 A Salesperson - Kenneth Berry
 Kiowan Youths – Frank Thomas, Jr., Rufus Peabody, Drew Price
 Sporting Girls – Barbara O'Neil, Lillian Okun
 Senator - John F. Morrissey
 The Mayor of Kiowa – Alfred Dalrymple
 Mrs. Skoll - Nina Varesi
 Skoll - Luther Williams
 Jailor - Walter Eviston
 Landlord – Harry Bellaver
 Leader of the Vigilantes – Karl Swenson
 The Woman With a Whip - Roberta Hoskins
 The Woman With a Club - Bela Axman
 Louis Sauerberger - Frederick Kemp
 A Whiskey Drinker - Leslie Hunt
 Mrs. Klopp – Katherine Emery
 Miss Sheriff - Helen Huberth 	
 Mrs. McHenty - Mary Jeffery
 Chairman - Robert Allen

Synopsis of scenes
The story line of the play followed the chronology of the prohibitionist leader's life, beginning with her birth in 1846 in Kentucky to a zealously pious father, her marriage to a chronic drunk, a second marriage to a country preacher, her public campaign against Demon Rum and her infamous marches culminating in the axing of booze barrels. The story concluded with her final appearance before a Town Hall gathering in Tennessee in 1910.

 Scene 1: A farmhouse in Kentucky. November 25, 1846.
 Scene 2: In front of the Moore home in Missouri. April, 1857.
 Scene 3: A room in the home of Dr. Gloyd in Holden. Missouri, June, 1868.
 Scene 4: Same as preceding scene. December, 1877.
 Scene 5: Interior of the Christian Church in Medicine Lodge. Kansas, July, 1899.
 Scene 6: A room in the Nation home in Medicine Lodge. A few weeks later.
 Scene 7: The front room of Mart Strong’s saloon in Medicine Lodge. February, 1900.
 Scene 8: O.L. Day’s drug store in Medicine Lodge. February, 1900.
 Scene 9: A street in Kiowa, Kansas. August, 1900.
 Scene 10: The jail in Kiowa. Immediately after preceding scene.
 Scene 11: The jail. Three weeks later.
 Scene 12: A room in Stag’s Hotel, Enterprise, Kansas. That night.
 Scene 13: Louis Sauerberger’s saloon, Topeka, Kansas. The next day.
 Scene 14: A room in the home of Mrs. Klopp in Kansas City, Missouri. June, 1903.
 Scene 15: The Town Hall, Waterville, Tennessee. May, 1910.

References

American plays
1932 plays
Broadway plays
Plays based on real people
Plays set in the 19th century
Plays set in the 1900s
Plays set in the 1910s
Plays set in Kentucky
Plays set in Kansas
Biographical plays about activists
Cultural depictions of American women
Play